A three-point field goal (also known as a "three-pointer" or "3-pointer") is a field goal in a basketball game, made from beyond the three-point line, a designated arc radiating from the basket. A successful attempt is worth three points, in contrast to the two points awarded for shots made inside the three-point line. The members on this list are the top 25 in 3-point field goals made in National Collegiate Athletic Association (NCAA) Division I women's competition. The statistic was first recognized in the 1987–88 season, when 3-point field goals were officially instituted by the NCAA for women's play. The women's line remained at 20 ft 9 in until being moved to the FIBA arc in 2021–22.

As of March 12, 2023, current  Oklahoma guard Taylor Robertson has the most three-pointers, with 534 in a career that began in 2018. While Robertson has played in one more season than previous record holder Kelsey Mitchell of Ohio State, she set the new record in her 138th career game, one fewer than Mitchell had played in her college career from 2014 to 2018. Mitchell remains the leader for most attempts with 1,286.

Five players on this list played in more than the standard four seasons due to benefiting from the NCAA's blanket COVID-19 eligibility waiver for players active in the 2020–21 season—Robertson, Kendall Spray, Katie Benzan, Aisha Sheppard, and the also currently-active Taylor Mikesell. All have played in five seasons.

Four players on this list split their collegiate careers between two or more schools. Spray played at UT Martin, Clemson, and Florida Gulf Coast. Benzan played at Harvard and Maryland. Mikesell also played at Maryland before transferring to Oregon and later Ohio State. Kim MacMillan first played at LIU Brooklyn and then at St. John's.

The player with the highest three-point percentage for her career on this list is Kaleena Mosqueda-Lewis of UConn at 44.7%, while Shrieka Evans of Grambling has the lowest at 31.9%.

Six programs have placed two players in the all-time top 25—Oklahoma with Robertson and Aaryn Ellenberg, Ohio State with Mitchell and Mikesell, Idaho with Taylor Pierce and Mikayla Ferenz, UT Martin with Spray and Heather Butler, Maryland with Benzan and Mikesell, and UConn with Mosqueda-Lewis and Katie Lou Samuelson.

Key

Top 25 3-point field goal leaders

Current through games of March 12, 2023.

Footnotes

References
General

Specific

NCAA Division I women's basketball statistical leaders
Lists of basketball players in the United States
Lists of women's basketball players in the United States